The MQM-61 Cardinal was a target drone designed and built by Beechcraft.

Development

While the Radioplane BTT was a popular piston-powered target, such a simple target was relatively easy to build and it developed competition. In 1955 Beechcraft designed the Model 1001, as the initial version of this target drone was designated, in response to a US Navy requirement for gunnery and air-to-air combat training. Production of the type began in 1959, with the drone being given the Navy designation of KDB-1, later MQM-39A. The Model 1001 led to the similar Model 1025 for the US Army, which gave it the MQM-61A designation. Beech also designed a variant powered by a turbojet engine and designated Model 1025-TJ, but nobody bought it.

The MQM-61A was a simple monoplane with a vee tail. It was substantially larger than the MQM-36 Shelduck, and powered by a 94 kW (125 hp) McCulloch TC6150-J-2 flat-six, air-cooled, two-stroke piston engine driving a two-blade propeller. It could tow banners or targets of its own, with two targets under each wing, and also carried scoring devices. Launch was by RATO booster, recovery was by parachute.

A total of 2,200 Cardinals of all variants were built, the majority for the US Army, with the rest operated by the US Navy, the US Marine Corps.

Surviving aircraft
 MQM-61 on display at the Aviation Unmanned Vehicle Museum in Caddo Mills, Texas.
 MQM-61 on display at the USS Alabama Battleship Memorial Park in Mobile, Alabama.

Specifications (MQM-61A)

References

External links

MQM-061
1950s United States special-purpose aircraft
Target drones of the United States
Single-engined tractor aircraft
High-wing aircraft